The Mozacu is a left tributary of the river Dâmbovnic in Romania. It discharges into the Dâmbovnic in Babaroaga.

References

Rivers of Romania
Rivers of Argeș County